Psammagrostis is a genus of plants in the grass family. The only known species is Psammagrostis wiseana, native to Western Australia.

References

Chloridoideae
Endemic flora of Western Australia
Poales of Australia
Monotypic Poaceae genera
Taxa named by Charles Edward Hubbard
Taxa named by Charles Gardner